Unexpected Guest is a 1947 American Western film directed by George Archainbaud and starring William Boyd. The film is a serial Western and part of the Hopalong Cassidy series. It is the 57th entry in a series of 66 films.

Plot

Cast
 William Boyd as Hopalong Cassidy
 Andy Clyde as California Carson
 Rand Brooks as Lucky Jenkins
 Una O'Connor as Matilda Hackett
 John Parrish as David J. Potter
 Patricia Tate as Ruth Baxter
 Nedrick Young as Ralph Baxter
 Earle Hodgins as Joshua Colter
 Joel Friedkin as Phineas Phipps
 Robert Williams as Matt Ogden
 William Ruhl as Sheriff

References

External links
 
 
 
 

1947 films
1947 Western (genre) films
United Artists films
American black-and-white films
Films directed by George Archainbaud
American Western (genre) films
Hopalong Cassidy films
1940s English-language films
1940s American films